Preston North End F.C. is a football club located in Preston, Lancashire. The team currently plays in the Football League Championship, the second tier of the English football league system. 

Preston were the first English league champions and won the FA Cup in the same season without conceding a goal, thereby achieving the first football "Double", and earning the nickname "The Invincibles" for completing a season unbeaten in both league and cup competition.

List of Preston North End players making 100 appearances

The following list includes players who have played in 100 or more League, FA Cup, League Cup and Football League Trophy matches for Preston North End, including substitute appearances. Appearances in other competitions are not included.
Players are listed according to the date of their first professional appearance for the club. 
Unless otherwise noted, league appearance and goal data is taken from the corresponding player article, and total appearance and goal data is sourced from the Footy Mad website.
Statistics are correct as of 31 August 2022soc.

Other significant Preston North End players

Preston North End players who did not make 100 appearances, but otherwise made a significant contribution to the club's history, are listed below.

Started at Preston North End
The following players had successful football careers after playing for Preston North End:

Mark Lawrenson – made 80 appearances for his hometown club 1975–1977.
David Beckham – made his football league debut in 1995 on loan at Preston North End.
Kevin Kilbane – made 55 appearances for his hometown club 1995–1997.

References

 
Lists of association football players by club in England
Players
Association football player non-biographical articles